Emmy Hennings (born Emma Maria Cordsen, 17 January 1885 – 10 August 1948) was a German poet and performing artist, founder of the Dadaist Cabaret Voltaire with her second husband Hugo Ball.

Life and work
Hennings was born on 17 January 1885 in Flensburg, German Empire, describing herself later as "a seaman's child".

After the end of her first marriage in 1906, Hennings was an itinerant performer, travelling over much of the European continent. She was a performer at the Cabaret Simplizissimus in Munich, when she met Ball in 1913. At the time, Hennings was already a published poet, whose works had appeared in left-wing publications called Pan and Die Aktion. In 1913 she also published a short poetry collection called Ether Poems, or Äthergedichte in German. Later, Hennings was a collaborator to the magazine Revolution, which was founded by Ball and Hans Leybold.

Hennings and Ball moved to Zurich in 1915, where they took part in the founding of the Cabaret Voltaire, which marked the beginning of the Dada movement. Hennings was a regular performer at the Cabaret Voltaire. Her performances included a role in Das Leben des Menschen (the Life of a Man), in which she appeared with Ball. This was the German premiere of the play by Leonid Andreev. Hennings also performed in a piece written by Ball, called Krippenspiel. After the Cabaret Voltaire ended, Hennings and Ball toured, performing mostly in hotels. Hennings sang, did puppetry, and danced to music composed by Ball. She also recited her own poetry. In 1916 Ball and Hennings created Arabella, their own ensemble troupe, where Hennings performed under the name Dagny. Hennings married Ball on 21 February 1920. Although they had no children together, Hennings had a daughter, Annemarie, from a previous relationship. Hennings, who outlived Ball by two decades, lived in Magliaso, Switzerland from 1942 to 1948. She died on 10 August 1948 at a clinic in Sorengo, Switzerland.

Dada star
In The Magic Bishop: Hugo Ball, Dada Poet, author Erdmute Wenzel White writes that Hennings “was admired by expressionists as the incarnation of the cabaret artist of her time... The shining star of the Voltaire, according to the Zuricher Post (Zurich Post), her role in Dada has not been adequately acknowledged.” (p. 11).

White also cites a poem by Johannes Becher which he uses as evidence that Emmy served as a muse for other artists of the time:"It was in Munich, at the Café Stefanie,Where I recited for you, Emmy, poemsThat I dared tell only you,"

References

Sources
Flight Out of Time: A Dada Diary, by Hugo Ball
Emmy Ball-Hennings: Leben im Vielleicht by Bärbel Reetz. Frankfurt: Suhrkamp, 2001
Emmy Ball-Hennings: Wege und Umwege zum Paradies: Biographie by René Gass. Zürich: Pendo, 1998
The Magic Bishop: Hugo Ball, Dada Poet by Erdmute Wenzel White

External links

 
 
 
 
The-artists-org short bio,links
Dancer poem with translation
Salisbury Theatre University short bio 
Links to some poems
Facsimile of Hennings' poem collection, Die letzte Freude (in German)

1885 births
1948 deaths
People from Flensburg
Dada
Modernist theatre
People from the Province of Schleswig-Holstein